Isoko may refer to:

 Isoko region, a region of Delta State, Nigeria
 Isoko people, an ethnic group which inhabits the region
 Isoko language, the language spoken by that ethnic group

Language and nationality disambiguation pages